XHEPAS-FM is a radio station on 94.9 FM in Mulegé, Baja California Sur.

History
XEPAS-AM 1200 received its concession on February 26, 1996. It moved to FM in 2010.

References

Radio stations in Baja California Sur
Radio stations established in 1996
Radio stations in Mexico with continuity obligations